Grésy-sur-Aix (literally Grésy on Aix) is a commune in the Savoie department in the Auvergne-Rhône-Alpes region in south-eastern France. It is part of the urban area of Chambéry.

Notable people 

 Antoine Philibert Albert Bailly, (1605-1691), bishop of Aosta

See also
Communes of the Savoie department

References

External links

Official site

Communes of Savoie